The Proskurov uezd was one of the uezds (uyezds or subdivisions) of the Podolia Governorate of the Russian Empire. It was situated in the northwestern part of the governorate. Its administrative centre was Khmelnytskyi (Proskurov).

Demographics
At the time of the Russian Empire Census of 1897, Proskurovsky Uyezd had a population of 226,091. Of these, 78.1% spoke Ukrainian, 12.1% Yiddish, 6.4% Polish, 2.9% Russian, 0.3% Tatar and 0.1% German as their native language.

References

 
Uezds of Podolia Governorate